The 2016 KPN Bangkok Open was a professional tennis tournament played on hard courts. It was the eighth edition of the tournament which was part of the 2016 ATP Challenger Tour. It took place in Bangkok, Thailand between 4 and 10 January 2016.

Singles main-draw entrants

Seeds

 1 Rankings are as of December 28, 2015.

Other entrants
The following players received wildcards into the singles main draw:
  Nattan Benjasupawan
  Phassawit Burapharitta
  Jirat Navasirisomboon
  Kittipong Wachiramanowong

The following player received entry to the main draw as a protected ranking:
  Marco Chiudinelli

The following players received entry from the qualifying draw:
  Ilya Ivashka 
  Jason Jung
  Maximilian Neuchrist 
  Dmitry Popko

Champions

Singles

 Mikhail Youzhny def.  Go Soeda 6–3, 6–4

Doubles

 Johan Brunström /  Andreas Siljeström def.  Gero Kretschmer /  Alexander Satschko 6–3, 6–4

External links

 
 ATP Challenger Tour
Tennis, ATP Challenger Tour, KPN Bangkok Open
Tennis, ATP Challenger Tour, KPN Bangkok Open

Tennis, ATP Challenger Tour, KPN Bangkok Open